Mitre Bridge Exchange was a railway station in Old Oak Common in the parish of Hammersmith, Middlesex, England, which was opened on 27 May 1844 but closed on 1 December 1844. It was formed of high-level and low-level platforms. It was closed when the West London Line was relocated further west and the original line was closed to passengers on 1 December 1844 and to goods in 1860.

References

1844 establishments in England
1844 disestablishments in England
Railway stations in Great Britain opened in 1844
Railway stations in Great Britain closed in 1844
Disused railway stations in the London Borough of Hammersmith and Fulham